Mario Melchiori was an Italian rower. He competed in the men's double sculls event at the 1928 Summer Olympics.

References

Year of birth missing
Year of death missing
Italian male rowers
Olympic rowers of Italy
Rowers at the 1928 Summer Olympics
Place of birth missing